Thorium(IV) orthosilicate (ThSiO4) is an inorganic chemical compound. Thorite is a mineral that consists essentially of thorium othosilicate.

References

Silicates
Thorium compounds